Oscar Eduardo Saavedra Flores (born 16 October 1993) is a Mexican professional footballer who plays as a forward for Central Texas Lobos FC.

Club career

León

Saavedra played with the Club León Academy from 2013 to 2016, and debuted with Club León on September 18, 2013, during the Copa MX tournament in a match against C.D. Guadalajara.

Tepatitlán
Oscar Saavedra signed with C.D. Tepatitlán de Morelos for the 2017–18 seasons, where the team was proclaimed champion of the 2017–18 season of Serie A after defeating Loros of the University of Colima.

U.S. Experience
Participated with Corinthians FC of San Antonio on loan 4 games during the 2016 season, and in 2019 joined the Central Texas Lobos FC for the 2019 season of the Gulf Coast Premier League.

References

External links
 
 
 

Living people
1993 births
Mexican footballers
Mexican expatriate footballers
Association football forwards
Liga MX players
Club León footballers
Mexican expatriate sportspeople in the United States
Expatriate soccer players in the United States
Footballers from Jalisco
People from Arandas, Jalisco